Acholius held the office of Magister Admissionum in the reign of Valerian (253—260 AD).  One of his works was titled Acta, and contained an account of the history of Aurelian.  It was in nine books at least.  He also wrote a life of Alexander Severus.

References

Latin historians
3rd-century historians